Lesley-Ann Jones is an author, journalist and broadcaster who spent more than 20 years as a national newspaper journalist on Fleet Street. Of Welsh descent, she was born in Kent, England. She read French and Spanish at Westminster University, and worked in the music industry. She later followed her father, sportswriter Ken Jones, to Fleet Street.

Biography
In the 1980s, she worked for Chrysalis Records, London, the label of some major acts at the time (Spandau Ballet, Jethro Tull (band), Special AKA, Midge Ure & Ultravox, Blondie), where she wrote sleeve notes, prepared press releases and organised interviews for the national press. She moved into television at the inception of Channel 4. The prime-time Saturday-night pop-music magazine series ‘Ear Say’, which she co-presented with Capital Radio DJs Nicky Horne and Gary Crowley, led to guest appearances on a variety of TV and radio shows, including Capital's You Ain’t Heard Nothing Yet, a weekly music quiz produced by pop guru Phil Swern, and Radio Clyde’s Bill Padley Show, with Padley and singer/songwriter Jim Diamond. She also wrote a weekly column for The Sun. She spent six years as a showbusiness feature-writer for the Daily Mail, Mail On Sunday and You magazine, touring with Paul McCartney, David Bowie, the Rolling Stones, Elton John, Queen and other star acts of the day.

As a freelance feature writer, her contributions to publications in the UK, US, Australia and Europe included interviews with Tony Blair, Frank Sinatra, Raquel Welch, Mel Gibson, Charlton Heston, Paul McCartney, Brigitte Bardot and Princess Margaret. She appeared weekly for several years on BFBS Forces Radio with the late Tommy Vance, and worked on documentaries on Stevie Nicks, Ken Russell and Jermaine Jackson. She also appeared on TV shows Fax!, Music Box and Livewire in the UK, and E! Entertainment and Hard Copy in the US. The Pampers diaper commercial she filmed with her baby daughter for Saatchi & Saatchi was aired across Europe for 18 months, one of the campaign’s most successful ads.

Following three years writing columns and features for the Sunday Express and the Mail on Sunday, she revised and updated her 1997 definitive biography of Queen frontman Freddie Mercury. Republication by Hodder & Stoughton in October 2011 (paperback 2012) was due to coincide with the release of a Mercury biopic to commemorate the 21st anniversary of the singer's  death. However,  production of the film was delayed, and it was not released until 2018.

In 2010, she was appointed Showbusiness Editor for SKY/Freesat's music channel Vintage TV. She wrote and presented their celebrity interview series 'Me & Mrs Jones' (produced by Transparent Television and featuring heritage rock and pop artists Rick Wakeman, Frank Allen of The Searchers, Leee John of Imagination, Kim Wilde, Steve Harley of Cockney Rebel, Tony Hadley of Spandau Ballet and Francis Rossi and Rick Parfitt of Status Quo.)

In December 2015, she wrote and co-produced 'The Last Lennon Interview' for ShowBiz TV. It was internationally acclaimed, and was first aired on the 35th anniversary of John Lennon’s death. It was the first time former BBC Radio 1 DJ Andy Peebles had publicly talked about his interview with John and Yoko in New York only a couple of days before Lennon was murdered.

Personal life
The mother of a son and two daughters, she lives in London and Kent, England.

Her father was the sports reporter Ken Jones and her uncle is ex-footballer Cliff Jones.

Published works
The Stone Age: Sixty Years of the Rolling Stones (biography, John Blake/Bonnier Books, 2022)
Love of My Life: The Life and Loves of Freddie Mercury (biography, Coronet, 2021)
Who Killed John Lennon?: The Life, Loves And Deaths of The Greatest Rock Star  (biography, John Blake, 2020)
Tumbling Dice (memoir, Independently Published, 2019)
Bohemian Rhapsody: The Definitive Biography of Freddie Mercury (biography, Hodder & Stoughton, 2018)
Hero: David Bowie (biography, Hodder & Stoughton, 2016)
Imagine (fiction, Mulcahy Books, 2015)
Ride A White Swan: The Lives And Death Of Marc Bolan (Hodder & Stoughton, 2012)
Freddie Mercury: The Definitive Biography (rewrite, biography, Hodder & Stoughton, 2011)Freddie Mercury: The Definitive Biography (biography, Hodder and Stoughton, 1997)Excuses, Excuses with Gray Jolliffe (humour, Kyle Cathie, 1996)Wow! with Caris Davis (fiction, Mainstream under the pseudonym Amy Auden, 1994 )Naomi: The Rise and Rise of the Girl from Nowhere  (biography, Vermilion, 1993)Kylie Minogue: The Superstar Next Door (biography, Omnibus Press/Media Business International, 1990)The Sony Tape Rock Review'' (review, Rambletree, compiled and edited by Robin Eggar, Phil Swern & Lesley-Ann Jones)

External links
 Official website

References

Living people
English journalists
English biographers
People from Kent
Year of birth missing (living people)